Pentyl pentanoate (C4H9COOC5H11) is an ester used in dilute solution to replicate the scent or flavour of apple, and sometimes pineapple. It is referred to as pentyl valerate or amyl pentanoate using classical nomenclature. it can be used for a variety of chemical uses, such as in the production of flavoured products, like sweets.

References

Flavors
Valerate esters